Al-Thani Cabinet may refer to:

First Al-Thani Cabinet
Second Al-Thani Cabinet